The Commission for Dark Skies (CfDS) (formerly the Campaign for Dark Skies; the name was changed on March 29, 2015) is the United Kingdom's largest anti-light-pollution campaign group forming part of the international dark-sky movement.

It is run by the British Astronomical Association (BAA) and affiliated with the International Dark-Sky Association (IDA), and composed of a network of local officers (and other members) who try to improve lighting in their areas and advise local people.

The campaign was founded in 1989 by amateur astronomers as a sub-section of the BAA specialising in combatting skyglow.  It is now open to non-members of the BAA, includes lighting engineers and environmentalists, and campaigns on the wider effects of light pollution.

Legislation

CfDS's work with the House of Commons Science and Technology Committee on legislating against light pollution has resulted in the government including provisions in their Clean Neighbourhoods and Environment Bill.

Dark sky park, island and reserve

Members of the CfDS have been involved in the following International Dark-Sky Association designations:

 Galloway Forest Park – Dark Sky Park (2009)
 Sark –  IDA's first international dark-sky island (Silver tier) (2011)
 Exmoor – Dark Sky Reserve (2011)
 Elan Valley Estate (mid-Wales) Dark Sky Park (2015)
 Tomintoul and Glenlivet-Cairngorms Dark Sky Park (2018)

Publications

In 2009, the CfDS published its handbook Blinded by the Light?.

Conferences

 CfDS 2006: Dark-Skies Symposium, Portsmouth, UK, September 15–16, 2006.
 Exterior lighting, statutory nuisance and light pollution, De Montfort University, April, 2006.
 Planning, Exterior Lighting and the Environment, De Montfort University, 20 April 2012.

Notes

References

 Campaign for Dark Skies, Blinded by the Light - A Handbook on light pollution, Campaign for Dark Skies, 2009
 Mizon, Bob, Light Pollution - Responses and Remedies, Springer, 2002.
 Mizon, Bob, Light Pollution - Responses and Remedies, 2nd Edition, Springer, 2012.
 Mizon, Bob, "20 years of fighting for the stars", Astronomy Now, September 2009. pp28–31
 Mizon, Bob, 'Finding a Million-Star Hotel' Springer, 2018
 Philip's, in association with the BAA Campaign for Dark Skies, Dark Skies Map, Philip's, 2004.
 Tabb, Michael, "Where are the UK's darkest skies", Astronomy Now, November 2004. pp75–6 (Article on the production of the Philip's Dark Skies Map.)
 Various authors, "Focus - Light Pollution", Astronomy Now, April 2001. pp49–59

External links
 
 The CfDS's online image library
 CfDS - Facebook
 CfDS - Twitter
 Light Pollution and  Astronomy - House of Commons Report, 2003. (pdf)
Conference Proceedings
 CfDS 2006 (pdf)
 Exterior lighting, statutory nuisance and light pollution, DeMontfort University, April, 2006
 Light Pollution: Causes and effects (pdf)
 Exterior Lighting as a Statutory Nuisance (pdf)
 Is Lighting Needed to reduce Crime? (pdf)
 Effective use of lighting as a crime deterrent (pdf)

+
Organizations established in 1989
Environmental organisations based in the United Kingdom
Astronomy in the United Kingdom
Amateur astronomy organizations